Ibourahima Sidibé is a Malian professional footballer who plays as a midfielder.

International career 
In January 2014, coach Djibril Dramé, invited him to be a part of the Mali squad for the 2014 African Nations Championship. He helped the team to the quarter finals where they lost to Zimbabwe by two goals to one.

References

External links 
 
 Ibourahima Sidibé at Footballdatabase

Living people
Mali international footballers
Malian footballers
Malian expatriate footballers
2014 African Nations Championship players
1992 births
Djoliba AC players
AS Real Bamako players
Maghreb de Fès players
Fath Union Sport players
Kawkab Marrakech players
Al Safa FC players
Malian Première Division players
Botola players
Saudi Second Division players
Association football midfielders
Malian expatriate sportspeople in Morocco
Expatriate footballers in Morocco
Malian expatriate sportspeople in Saudi Arabia
Expatriate footballers in Saudi Arabia
21st-century Malian people
Mali A' international footballers
2020 African Nations Championship players
2022 African Nations Championship players